The 1990 BC Lions finished in fourth place in the West Division with a 6–11–1 record and failed to make to playoffs.

Offseason

CFL Draft

Preseason

Regular season

Season standings

Season schedule

Awards and records
CFL's Most Outstanding Offensive Lineman Award – Jim Mills (OT)

1990 CFL All-Stars
OT – Jim Mills, CFL All-Star
LB – Willie Pless, CFL All-Star

References

BC Lions seasons
BC Lions
BC Lions